The Dunlop Tournament was a professional golf tournament played in the United Kingdom from 1949 to 1961. It replaced by the "Dunlop-Southport Tournament". It was sponsored by Dunlop. The last event was played in 1961 when Dunlop withdrew their funding, although the continued to support the Dunlop Masters. The tournament was generally played in early May, except in 1951 when it was played in April and 1961 which was played in late June and early July. and was played over 72 holes of stroke play. From 1950 to 1958 the tournament was played over 90 holes. The first two rounds were played on two different courses after which there was cut and the remaining three rounds were played on the main course.

Winners

References

Golf tournaments in the United Kingdom